Walter Pierce Richardson (born April 1, 1943) is an American former competition swimmer and former world record-holder.  Richardson competed in the 1964 Summer Olympics in Tokyo, Japan, where he swam the butterfly leg for the gold medal-winning U.S. team in the preliminary heats of the men's 4×100-meter medley relay.  He did not receive a medal because only those swimmers who competed in the event final were medal-eligible under the 1964 Olympic rules.

See also
 List of University of Minnesota people
 World record progression 4 × 100 metres medley relay

References

External links
 

1943 births
Living people
American male butterfly swimmers
World record setters in swimming
Minnesota Golden Gophers men's swimmers
Olympic swimmers of the United States
Swimmers from Chicago
Swimmers at the 1963 Pan American Games
Swimmers at the 1964 Summer Olympics
Pan American Games gold medalists for the United States
Pan American Games medalists in swimming
Medalists at the 1963 Pan American Games